Mictēcacihuātl (meaning "Lady of the Dead"), in Aztec mythology, is a death deity and consort of Mictlāntēcutli, god of the dead and ruler of Mictlān, the lowest level of the underworld.

Her role is to watch over the bones of the dead and preside over the ancient festivals of the dead. These festivals evolved from Aztec traditions into the modern Day of the Dead after synthesis with Spanish traditions. She now presides over the contemporary festival as well. She is known as the "Lady of the Dead", since it is believed that she was born, then sacrificed as an infant. Mictēcacihuātl was represented with a flayed body and with jaw agape to swallow the stars during the day.

In popular culture
Mictēcacihuātl is a major character in Onyx Equinox.
Under the name "Lady Micte", Mictēcacihuātl is a supporting character in Maya and the Three.

See also
 Santa Muerte

Notes

References

 
 

Aztec goddesses
Death goddesses
Underworld goddesses
Mesoamerican deities